Vatulele (pronounced ) is a coral and volcanic island  south of Viti Levu, Fiji's largest island. Its maximum altitude is only .

The island is inhabited by four villages, including Lomanikaya , Ekubu , Taunovo and Bouwaqa.  Economic activities include coconut and taro farming, fishing and selling of Fijian hand printed tapa. Vatulele is known for its Legend of the Red Prawns and Petroglyphs.

Vatulele is a raised coral limestone paradise that lies to the south of Fiji's main island of Viti Levu.  Vatulele, often discussed but rarely visited, has figured prominently in Fijian legend because of its extraordinary red prawns.  Known as ura-buta (cooked prawns) or uradamudamu (red prawn), they have to be seen to be believed.

The islanders treat the prawns with great respect, consider them sacred and are forbidden to kill or harm them in any way.  Legend records that anyone who tries to take them away will suffer a shipwreck.

Scientists may not share the explanation of the origins of the ura-buta (red prawns) but they remain fascinated by the environment in which the prawns live. Known as anchialine habitats, they are pools some distance away from the sea but which still maintain tidal influence. In actuality most of the pools are brackish due to interactions between the lens of freshwater under the island and the tidal influence.  Linked with these anchialine pool is a great network of caves and passages, most of them virtually unexplored.

Vatulele (Ringing rock) has much more to offer than its red prawns, extraordinary though they are.  It is home to Fiji's most skillful makers of tapa cloth (masi), rock paintings and one of the world's most exclusive resorts.  The masi comes from the bark of the paper mulberry tree and all over the island there are small clearings in the forest which have been planted with this tree.  A visit to any of the island's four villages will bring with it the unceasing and hypnotic sound of heavy wooden clubs striking repeatedly against something solid.  If you pluck up enough courage to venture inside the tin shed from whence the sound comes, you will see a sweating woman pounding strips of bark, flattening and softening the fibres sufficiently to make into the highest quality masi. Nearby, giant cauldrons full of dye made from mangrove bark bubble quietly to themselves. Most of the traditional designs used in the masi incorporate triangles and this motif has become one of the symbols of the Vatulele Island resort.

Vatulele possesses petroglyphs, early Fijian rock art, dated at 3000 years old. The face, with its 12 "hairs" is one of the most prominent rock paintings in a group only a kilometre from the island's resort.

Vatulele has some of the best hard corals in Fiji and because of the relatively low fishing pressure there are many more large fish than one usually sees in Fiji.

Islands of Fiji
Viti Levu